Bandung International Airport may refer to:
Husein Sastranegara International Airport
Bandung Majalengka International Airport